The book Smart Moves: Why Learning Is Not All In Your Head was written in 1995 by neurophysiologist and educator Carla Hannaford (revised and enlarged second edition published in 2005), and includes an introduction by neuroscientist Candace Pert.

In Smart Moves, Hannaford looks at the body's roles in thinking and learning, citing research from child development, physiology, and neuroscience. Hannaford examines the ways that sensorimotor experiences affect short- and long-term memory, from infancy through adulthood, and argues that movement is crucial to learning.

In her book, Hannaford offers alternatives to enhance learning ability. She also details the roles in learning played by various areas of the brain, and examines the interplay of brain, body, and environment.

Hannaford is an advocate of movement and play in learning, discussing the importance of sensorimotor development (visual, auditory, tactile, and kinesthetic readiness) to the learning process. She provides several case examples of children whose learning improved through use of the controversial Brain Gym activities, as well as including her own research done with Brain Gym.

In Smart Moves, Carla Hannaford describes how emotions and the physiological stress reaction can affect the everyday lives of both children and adults. She invents the term "SOSOH" (Stressed Out, Survival-Oriented Humans) for people with learning disabilities or attention difficulties. She argues that ADD, ADHD, and all other learning problems are related to stress, as stress produces survival-oriented behavior while inhibiting the learning process.

Smart Moves proposes approaches to support learning, including:

 dietary awareness: drinking enough water, less sugar intake, etc.
 Practicing physical movement helps the brain perceive events in a less stressful way.
 Creating a more calm environment for people with learning difficulties

Carla Hannaford is also the author of The Dominance Factor: How Knowing Your Dominant Eye, Ear, Brain, Hand, & Foot Can Improve Your Learning (1997), Awakening the Child Heart: Handbook for the Global Parenting (2002), and Playing in the Unified Field: Raising and Becoming Conscious, Creative Human Beings (2010).

See also 
 Stress: General adaptation syndrome
 Perceptual learning
 Vision training

References

1995 non-fiction books
Works about educational psychology